Vanesa Kaladzinskaya (born 27 December 1992, in Babruysk) is a Belarusian freestyle wrestler. She competed in the freestyle 48 kg event at the 2012 Summer Olympics; after defeating Zhuldyz Eshimova in the 1/8 finals, she was eliminated by Carol Huynh in the quarterfinals.

In March 2021, she qualified at the European Qualification Tournament to compete at the 2020 Summer Olympics in Tokyo, Japan. She won one of the bronze medals in the women's 53 kg event at the 2020 Summer Olympics held in Tokyo, Japan.

References

External links
 

1992 births
Living people
Belarusian female sport wrestlers
Olympic wrestlers of Belarus
Wrestlers at the 2012 Summer Olympics
Wrestlers at the 2020 Summer Olympics
Olympic bronze medalists for Belarus
Olympic medalists in wrestling
Medalists at the 2020 Summer Olympics
People from Babruysk
European Games competitors for Belarus
Wrestlers at the 2015 European Games
Wrestlers at the 2019 European Games
World Wrestling Championships medalists
European Wrestling Champions
Sportspeople from Mogilev Region
21st-century Belarusian women